Greece participated at the 1999 World Championships in Athletics in Seville, Spain with a team of 42 athletes (24 men, 18 women). The team won 6 medals and ended up in the 4th place of the Championships, achieving the best results in the history of Greek athletics.

Medals

Results

See also
Greece at the IAAF World Championships in Athletics

References

http://www.gazzetta.gr/article/item/218894-mia-diorganose-me-hruse-istoria-vids

http://www.tovima.gr/sports/article/?aid=113510

1999
World Championships in Athletics
Nations at the 1999 World Championships in Athletics